The Conservative Party Members of Parliament make up the second largest group of MPs in the capital. The Conservative Party currently holds 20 seats out of 73 in Greater London.

Members of Parliament

See also 

 List of parliamentary constituencies in London
 List of Labour Party Members of Parliament in London
 List of Liberal Democrat Party Members of Parliament in London

External links 
 London Conservative Party

London
Conservative